Freud Communications is a public relations firm based in London. It was founded in 1985 by Matthew Freud. He is the great-grandson of the Austrian psychoanalyst Sigmund Freud, who himself was the uncle of Edward Bernays, the Austrian-American pioneer of public relations.

Overview 
Freud Communications was bought in 1994 by another independent agency in the United Kingdom, Abbott Mead Vickers (AMV), for about £10 million only for Matthew Freud together with other partners, to buy back the company in 2001, for a similar sum. That was when AMV was itself purchased by the US group Omnicom. Freud Communications USA, which closed in February 2009, was based in New York City. 

In 1999 Leapman reported in The Times that Freud Communications had offered an Internet brand management service to its clients. This would "scour the Net for references to its clients" and if they were criticised, "the agency would use rebuttal tactics to minimise the potentially negative impact of online inaccuracy". In 2007 PR Week ran a story documenting the use of WikiScanner to track anonymous edits and link them to organizations through their IP addresses; it found that "Freud Communications' London office was caught making Wikipedia edits on behalf of clients."

In June 2005, the French Publicis Groupe (then the third largest communications firm in the world) acquired a 50.1% stake in Freud Communications.In 2006, Freud purchased advertising agency DFGW. 

In 2011, Freud Communications had a turnover of around £40 million per year. It has a staff of more than two hundred and was ranked by PR Week in their ranking system as 6th in the UK.

Clients
 Baby Cow Productions
 Formula E
 Lewis Hamilton
 Mindhorn
 Mo Farah
 Working Title

References

External links 
 

Public relations companies of the United Kingdom
Conflict-of-interest editing on Wikipedia
1985 establishments in the United Kingdom